James Osborne VC (13 April 1857 – 1 February 1928) was an English recipient of the Victoria Cross, the highest and most prestigious award for gallantry in the face of the enemy that can be awarded to British and Commonwealth forces.

Osborne was 23 years old, and a private in the 2nd Battalion, The Northamptonshire Regiment, British Army during the First Boer War when the following deed took place for which he was awarded the VC.

On 22 February 1881 at Wesselstroom, South Africa, Private Osborne rode out under heavy fire, picked up a private who was lying wounded and carried him safely into camp. His citation read:
His VC was destroyed in the Belfast Blitz in 1941.

References

British recipients of the Victoria Cross
First Boer War recipients of the Victoria Cross
1857 births
1928 deaths
Northamptonshire Regiment soldiers
British military personnel of the First Boer War
People from Dacorum (district)
British Army personnel of the Anglo-Zulu War
British Army recipients of the Victoria Cross
Military personnel from Hertfordshire
Burials in Hertfordshire